Up is the y-axis relative vertical direction opposed to down.

Up or UP may also refer to:

Arts and entertainment

Film
 Up! (1976 film), a sex comedy by Russ Meyer
 Up (1984 film), an Oscar-winning short film by Mike Hoover and Tim Huntley
 Up (2009 film), an animated feature by Disney/Pixar

Bands
 The Up, a Detroit protopunk band

Albums
 Up (ABC album), 1989
 Up (Right Said Fred album), 1992
 Up (Great Big Sea album), 1995
 Up (R.E.M. album), 1998
 Up (Peter Gabriel album), 2002
 Up! (album), by Shania Twain, 2002
 Up (film score), for the Disney/Pixar film, 2009
 Up (Pop Evil album), 2015

Songs
 "Up" (Cardi B song), 2021
 "Up" (Inna song), 2021
 "Up" (James Morrison song), 2011
 "Up" (Olly Murs song), 2014
 "Up" (The Saturdays song), 2008
 "Up!" (LoveRance song), 2011
 "Up!" (Samantha Jade song), 2014
 "Up!" (Shania Twain song), 2002
 "Up!" (Bini & BGYO song), 2022
 "Up", a 2021 song by Dune Rats
 "Up", a song by Justin Bieber from the 2010 album My World 2.0
 "Up!", a song by M83 from the 2008 album Saturdays = Youth
 "Up", a song by Nav from the 2017 mixtape Nav
 "Up", a song by Oneohtrix Point Never from the 2011 album Replica
 "Up", a 2007 song by Rob Crow
 "Up", a song by Take That from the 2017 album Wonderland

Television and film
 Up (TV channel), formerly known as GMC
 Up (TV program), on MSNBC
 Up (TV series), a British documentary series following several people over their lives

Other media
 Up (video game), based on the Disney/Pixar film
 Up!, a musical comedy also known as Via Galactica

Businesses and organizations

Political parties
 National Popular Party (Romania), a Romanian political party, "Uniunea Patrioților" in Romanian
 Patriotic Union (Colombia), a Colombian political party
 Labour United, a Polish political party, "Unia Pracy" in Polish
 Unidad Popular, a Chilean coalition of political parties
 Unidade Popular, a Brazilian political party
 United Party (disambiguation), any of several political parties
 Unity Party (disambiguation), any of several political parties

Schools
 Palacký University Olomouc, Czech Republic
 Panamerican University, Mexico, "Universidad Panamericana" in Spanish
 Pedagogical University, Mozambique
 Umutara Polytechnic, Rwanda
 University of Patras, Greece
 University of Pennsylvania, United States
 University of the Philippines, national university system of the Philippines
 University of the Philippines Diliman, its flagship university
 University of Phoenix, United States
 University of Poitiers, France
 University of Portland, United States
 University of Porto, Portugal
 University of Potsdam, Germany
 University of Pretoria, South Africa

Other businesses and organizations
 Up (airline), a former low-cost airline
 Bahamasair, IATA airline code UP
 Union Pacific Railroad
 Union Pearson Express, or UP Express, an airport rail link in Toronto, Canada
 United Press International, a news agency
 Abbreviation for university press
 Up (Australian bank), a digital bank

Places
 -up, a suffix in Australian place names
 United Provinces (disambiguation)
 University Park, Pennsylvania, United States
 University Park, Texas, United States
 Upper Peninsula of Michigan, United States
 Uttar Pradesh, India
 Eup (administrative division)

Science, technology, and mathematics
 Uncertainty principle, a fundamental limit to measurement precision
 Unified Process, a software development process framework
 Unrotated projectile, an anti-aircraft weapon
 UP (complexity)
 Up (game theory)
 Up quark, in physics
 Upper Paleolithic, a stone age

Other uses

 Volkswagen Up, an automobile
 Up, a cocktail term
 Up, a railroad direction
 Up, a term in sports designating one's turn, similar to "at bat" in baseball
 Underpowered (game balance)

See also
 
 
 Up Up Up Up Up Up, a 1999 album by Ani DiFranco
 Upward (disambiguation)
 1-up, in video games
 N-up, a printing page layout
 Straight up (bartending)
 Upp (disambiguation)
 ↑ (disambiguation) (up arrow)
 🆙, emoji character